Two Medicine Lake is located in Glacier National Park, in the U. S. state of Montana. Several hiking trails begin at the eastern end of the lake, which is accessible by vehicle. The National Historic Landmark Two Medicine Store and the National Register of Historic Places Swanson Boathouse structures are also near the eastern side of the lake. A short outlet stream connects Two Medicine Lake with Pray Lake to the northeast.

See also
List of lakes in Glacier County, Montana

References

Lakes of Glacier National Park (U.S.)
Lakes of Glacier County, Montana